Party Politics  (1984 - 2009) was a Thoroughbred racehorse most famous for his victory in the 1992 Grand National at Aintree Racecourse, ridden by Carl Llewellyn, trained by Nick Gaselee and owned by Patricia Thompson. He also finished second to Royal Athlete in the 1995 Grand National.
Party Politics won the 1992 Grand National five days before the 1992 UK General Election. He was retired after falling at the first open ditch (fence 3) in the 1996 Grand National.
He was put down in 2009, aged 25 due to old age.

Grand National record

Pedigree

References

1984 racehorse births
2009 racehorse deaths
Grand National winners
Thoroughbred family 3-i
National Hunt racehorses
Racehorses trained in the United Kingdom
Racehorses bred in the United Kingdom